Saadat Qoli-ye Sofla (also Romanized as Sa‘ādat Qolī-ye Soflá; also known as Qal‘eh Sādāt Qolī Pā’īn and Sa‘ādat Qolī-ye Pā’īn) is a village in Quchan Atiq Rural District, in the Central District of Quchan County, Razavi Khorasan Province, Iran. At the 2006 census, its population was 151, in 37 families.

References 

Populated places in Quchan County